The Sickle or the Cross is a 1949 American drama film directed by Frank Strayer, which stars Kent Taylor, Gloria Holden, and Gene Lockhart. The screenplay was written by Jesse L. Lasky Jr. from an original story by T. G. Eggers. Produced and distributed by the Lutheran Laymen's League, it had its world premiere in Burbank, California on July 1, 1949.

Cast list
 Kent Taylor as Rev. John Burnside, aka Comrade X-14
 Gloria Holden as Louise Canon
 Gene Lockhart as James Johnson
 David Bruce as George Hart
 Emmett Vogan as Walt Deems
 Kathleen Lockhart as Martha Deems
 Margaret Kerry as Betty Deems
 Arthur Stone as Tommy Deems
 Dudley Dickerson as Horatio
 Adeline De Walt Reynolds as Mrs. Burnside
 John Eldredge as Rev. Dodge
 Ivan Triesault as Morse
 Charles Halton as Dr. Short
 Gene Roth as Pakin
 Gayne Whitman as Tim Matthews
 Philip Ahn as Chinese official
 Victor Sen Yung as Chinese official

References

External links
 
 
 

1949 drama films
1949 films
American drama films
American black-and-white films
Films directed by Frank R. Strayer
1940s American films